The Phantom is  the twelfth album by American pianist and arranger Duke Pearson featuring performances recorded in 1968 and released on the Blue Note label.

Reception
The Allmusic review by Stephen Thomas Erlewine awarded the album 3 stars stating "The Phantom finds Pearson writing an ambitious set of post-bop that expands the boundaries of the music with Latin percussion and complex harmonies derived from the avant-garde... The results aren't always successful, but they are intriguing and worth investigating".

Track listing
All compositions by Duke Pearson except as indicated

 "The Phantom" - 10:21
 "Blues for Alvina" (Willie Wilson) - 3:09
 "Bunda Amerela (Little Yellow Streetcar)" - 5:46
 "Los Ojos Alegres (The Happy Eyes)" - 6:17
 "Say You're Mine" - 5:40
 "The Moana Surf" (Jerry Dodgion) - 7:23

Personnel
Duke Pearson - piano
Jerry Dodgion - flute, alto flute
Bobby Hutcherson - vibraphone
Sam Brown, Al Gafa - guitar
Bob Cranshaw - bass
Mickey Roker - drums
Victor Pantoja - congas
Carlos 'Patato' Valdés - conga, güiro

References

Blue Note Records albums
Duke Pearson albums
1968 albums
Albums recorded at Van Gelder Studio